Holiday Showdown is a BAFTA-nominated and Royal Television Society Award-winning reality television programme, produced by Chris Kelly for the United Kingdom independent TV production company RDF Media. It was first broadcast in 2003 on ITV in the United Kingdom.

Holiday Showdown was produced by RDF Television, part of the RDF Media Group. The executive producer was Nick Shearman, series producer was Tayte Simpson, and producer/director was Katharine Round.

The show's title music was a library piece called Heavyweight Hipster, composed by Billy Conrad and Sam Keaton.

Synopsis 
Holiday Showdown matches up two very different families with completely opposing ideas of what makes a good holiday and sends them away together for two weeks. The rules are non-negotiable, for each week of the holiday one of the families is in charge in their ideal holiday location. Both families have a challenge - to convince the other of the wonders of their holiday.
 
Holiday Showdown guarantees stress and conflict aplenty but also surprising insights discovering what happens when one family's idea of holiday heaven is someone else's holiday hell!
 
In 2007, Holiday Showdown was re-branded as Holiday Showdown: Extreme, but kept its original format.

Episodes
Below are some of the episodes that were broadcast between 2003 and 2009.

Controversy 
Following the 2005 broadcast of a show in which the Coppock family took part, they stated that they were not impressed with their portrayal. Mo Coppock stated: "I think the show was edited to make us appear to be common...  people wanted to stir things up between us to make it good telly".

References

External links
 

2003 British television series debuts
2009 British television series endings
British reality television series
ITV (TV network) original programming
British travel television series
Television series by Banijay